The Financial Ombudsman Service (FOS) was a member-funded Australian ombudsman service that provided external dispute resolution for consumers who were unable to resolve complaints with member financial services organisations.

The Credit and Investments Ombudsman (CIO) (until 2014 known as the Credit Ombudsman Service) is an Australian alternative dispute resolution or ombudsman that helps settle disputes between consumers and financial credit providers.

The Credit and Investments Ombudsman is one of the largest External Dispute Resolution (EDR) schemes in Australia by number of members, totaling over 22,000 in 2016.

History
It was established in 2003 as a result of the Mortgage & Finance Association of Australia ('MFAA') self-regulation, originally called the Mortgage Industry Ombudsman Scheme (MIOS). It later expanded its remit to include non-bank lending and other credit services, changing its name to the Credit Ombudsman Service Limited (COSL) to reflect this broader jurisdiction. Since November 2014 the scheme has been known as Credit and Investments Ombudsman. 

On 1 November 2018, the Australian Financial Complaints Authority launched as the one ombudsman service for all financial complaints, replacing three predecessor schemes, the Financial Ombudsman Service, the Credit and Investments Ombudsman and the Superannuation Complaints Tribunal.

Coverage
The CIO covers the following institutions:
 Credit providers
 Credit representatives
 Fund managers
 Credit unions
 Building societies
 Leasing companies
 Small Amount-lenders
 Mortgage Brokers
 non-bank lenders
 mortgage managers
 mortgage originators
 aggregators
 wholesale funders
 securitisation trustees
 housing co-operatives
 mortgage insurers
 Fund Managers
 Planners & Advisors
 Collections
 Hire & Rental

History
The Credit and Investments Ombudsman was first established as the Mortgage Industry Ombudsman Service Limited (MIOS) on 18 June 2003 as an EDR (External Dispute Resolution, known in other regions as ADR) scheme, and commenced operations on 1 July 2003 . They adopted the name Credit Ombudsman Service Limited (COSL) on 17 February 2004 before becoming the Credit and Investments Ombudsman (CIO) on 19 November 2014.

CIO is an approved EDR scheme under scheme approved by ASIC's Regulatory Guide RG 139 and its services are free for consumers. Funding is sourced from a combination of its membership fees and complaint fees paid by its participating Members. CIO can award compensation up to a maximum of $309,000 and other remedies, such as an apology, can be asked for.

Complaints process
CIO considers complaints or disputes about its participating Members' concerning their products and services, such as mortgages, credit products, financial planning, managed investment, insurance and deposit taking (savings).

CIO resolves disputes in a non-adjudicative means through conciliation, although the actual Ombudsman can make a decision which is binding on the member (a Determination).  Like all ASIC RG 139 approved schemes, Determinations made by the Ombudsman bind Members but not complainants.

CIO's conciliation process is both inquisitorial and consensus-based and focuses on producing a mutually satisfactory outcome.  Both Members and consumers are afforded an equal opportunity to put forward their cases.  This is intended to ensure procedural fairness and promote effective dispute resolution.

Coverage
The Credit and Investments Ombudsman covers complaints for consumers if they have dealt with a participating Member of CIO as:
 a borrower or prospective borrower 
 a loan guarantor or prospective guarantor 
 or have in any way sought the services of a Member in the ordinary course of their business in the credit marketplace.

Prior steps
Before CIO can consider a complaint, the complainant's must first have tried to resolve their complaint with the Member concerned by expressing their dissatisfaction either in writing or via telephone.

Every CIO Member has to have a dedicated Complaints Contact Person as part of their membership and must also have in place procedures called Internal Dispute Resolution Procedures or 'IDR Procedures'. The IDR Procedures require that a Member must:
 give you the name and contact details of their Complaints Contact Person before undertaking any services for you. 
 give you a copy of their Internal Dispute Resolution (IDR) Procedures if you ask for them.
 give you a substantive response within 45 days of lodging your complaint with them (if there is a delay they must inform you of the reason).

Complaints covered
The types of complaints covered by the CIO are set out in the CIO Rules. In general, a consumer can make a complaint to CIO if they believe that the Member they have dealt with has:
 breached relevant laws.
 breached the MFAA Code of Practice or other recognised Codes of Practice.
 not met standards of good practice in the Credit Industry.
 acted unfairly.

There are some types of disputes that CIO are unable to consider which are specified in the CIO Rules and Guidelines.

 if the complaint is about someone who is not a Member of CIO at the time the complaint is made. 
 if the complainant is not the person to whom the credit services in question were directly provided by the Member.
 if a claim where the loss caused by the FSP's conduct is, or appears to be, more than $500,000.
 if the complaint is being, or has previously been, dealt with by a court, tribunal, arbitrator or other dispute resolution scheme.
 if the complaint is more appropriately dealt with by the courts or other procedure.

Cost
There is no fee for individuals or small businesses when making a complaint to the Credit and Investments Ombudsman all costs are covered by the scheme members.

See also
 Ombudsman
 Financial Ombudsman Service (Australia)

References

External links
 

Financial regulatory authorities of Australia
Ombudsmen in Australia
Dispute resolution